Air Montmagny, trading as Montmagny Air Service is an on-demand aircraft charter company based in Montmagny, Quebec, Canada. It operates passenger and cargo services.

History 
It was founded by Marius Lachaine as Montmagny Air Service in 1952 and acquired by Gilles Couillard in 1954. It was then sold to Gaston Gosselin in 1980 and definitely renamed Air Montmagny in 1993.

Destinations

Air Montmagny serves five of the islands of the Isle-aux-Grues archipelago.

Since the nearby l'Isle-aux-Grues island has no ferry service during winter, Air Montmagny serves as the main link to the land. They carry passengers, goods, and  also serves as "school bus" for students attending school in Montmagny.

Fleet
As of September 2019, Air Montmagny has the following aircraft registered with Transport Canada.

References

External links
Air Montmagny

Charter airlines of Canada
Montmagny, Quebec